The Canton of Douvrin is one of the cantons of the arrondissement of Béthune, in the Pas-de-Calais department, in northern France. Its seat is the town Douvrin.

Composition
At the French canton reorganisation which came into effect in March 2015, the canton was expanded from 5 to 14 communes:

Annequin
Auchy-les-Mines
Billy-Berclau
Cambrin
Cuinchy
Douvrin
Festubert
Givenchy-lès-la-Bassée
Haisnes
Lorgies
Noyelles-lès-Vermelles
Sailly-Labourse
Vermelles
Violaines

References

Douvrin